Clan Grant is a Highland Scottish clan.

History

Origins

One theory is that the ancestors of the chiefs of Clan Grant came to Scotland with the Normans to England where the name is found soon after the conquest of that country, although some historians have asserted that the Grants were part of the Siol Alpin group of families who descend from Alpin, father of Kenneth MacAlpin, first king of Scots. The oral history of the clan and later recorded in writing for the clan chiefs instead recounts an origin from Norway before coming to the lands in Strathspey with Malcolm III 

The first Grants to appear in Scotland are recorded in the 13th century when they acquired the lands of Stratherrick. One of the family, possibly a Gregory Grant, married Mary, daughter of Sir John Bisset, and from this marriage came at least two sons. One of these sons was Sir Laurence le Grand who became Sheriff of Inverness. He married the daughter of Alexander Comyn, Earl of Buchan. She was descended from Donald III, King of Scotland.

Wars of Scottish Independence

During the Wars of Scottish Independence Clan Grant were supporters of William Wallace and John and Randolph Grant were captured at the Battle of Dunbar (1296). The Clan Grant later supported Robert the Bruce in competition for the Scottish Crown. The victory of Robert the Bruce confirmed the Grants in their lands of Strathspey, where they became established Highland chiefs.

The taking of Castle Grant, 14th century; Originally a Comyn Clan stronghold, Clan traditions tell us that the castle was taken from the Comyns by a combined force of the Grants and MacGregors.

15th and 16th centuries

The next available reference is of Duncan le Grant in 1434, and later, Sir Duncan Grant of Freuchie (Castle Grant), who inherited land in Dulnain valley in upper Speyside from his mother, Matilda of Glencarnie. Her family had partially owned it since 1180, when Richard I of England  gave Kinveachy (approximately ten miles southwest of Castle Grant) to Gille Brigte, Earl of Strathearn.

By the 16th century the clan and its chief had become powerful enough to play a part in national politics. Their main allies being the Clan Gordon, whose chief was the powerful Earl of Huntly.

In 1535 James Grant, 3rd Laird of Freuchie was made responsible for the policing of Strathspey.

In 1580 a Robert Grant defeated an English champion at a jousting tournament while on an embassy in the south. Towards the end of the 16th century the Grants began to quarrel with their old allies the Gordons, over religion. The Grants being Protestant and the Gordons being Catholic.

In 1586 the Earl of Huntly allied with the Clan MacDonald and Clan Cameron who both had a history of raiding the Grant's lands. The Grants responded by bringing in the Clan Gregor but they came off worse in a clash at Ballindalloch. By the late 16th century, Clan Grant became an important clan in the Scottish Highlands. During this period, the clan's actions resulted in the murder of the Earl of Moray and the defeat of the Earl of Argyll at the Battle of Glenlivet in 1594. The Chief of Clan Grant ordered his men to retreat as soon as the action began. This treacherous move led to the defeat of Clan Campbell of Argyll.

17th century and Civil War
In 1613 King James VI of Scotland wrote to John Grant of Freuchie chief of Clan Grant complaining that he was sheltering outlaws from the Clan MacGregor. The chief responded by sending the notorious Alistair MacAllister MacGregor to Edinburgh. However, the King was not satisfied and in 1615 fined Grant 16,000 merks for protecting the MacGregors.

During the 1639–1651 Wars of the Three Kingdoms, Captain David Grant led his forces in support of the Covenanter forces against the Royalist forces at the Battle of Tippermuir in 1644. In October 1645, Clan Cameron raided the lands of the Clan Grant. The Grants gave chase catching the Camerons in the Battle of the Braes of Strathdearn, where the Cameron men were defeated and many clansmen were slain.

In 1651, Sir James Grant of Grant, 16th Chief, led the clan to fight for Charles I and the Royalists at the Battle of Worcester in 1651. Also, an alliance between Sir James Grant and the Earl of Huntly led to the annihilation of the Clan Farquharson.

Like many others, the Grants participated on both sides after the deposition of James II & VII in November 1688 by William of Orange. The Grants of Glenmoriston fought with the Jacobites at the Battle of Killiecrankie in July 1689, while others were part of the Williamite force under Sir Thomas Livingstone, that defeated the Jacobites at the Battle of Cromdale in May 1690.

18th century and Jacobite uprisings

1715 – 1716 rising
During the Jacobite rising of 1715 the main part of the Clan Grant supported the British Government. In 1715 the Laird of Grant withdrew his forces which led to the defeat of government forces at the Skirmish of Alness. However soon after the Clan Grant helped retake Inverness from the Jacobites during Siege of Inverness (1715). In 1715 the fighting force of the Clan Grant was given as 850 men by General George Wade. At the Battle of Sheriffmuir in 1715, Grants fought on both sides. The British government forces won the battle with many of the Jacobites surrendering to General Grant.

Black Watch

General Wade's report on the Highlands in 1724, estimated the clan strength at 800 men. In 1725, six Independent Highland Companies (Black Watch) were formed to support the Government. One from Clan Grant, one from Clan Fraser of Lovat, one from Clan Munro and three from Clan Campbell. In 1739, ten Independent Highland Companies were formed into the 43rd Highlanders (Black Watch) regiment.

1745 – 1746 rising
During the Jacobite rising of 1745 the chief of Clan Grant again supported the British Government. However once again he withdrew his troops which again led to the defeat of government forces, this time at the Battle of Inverurie (1745).

One branch of the Clan Grant, the Grants of Glenmoriston, sided with the Jacobites and fought at the Battle of Prestonpans in 1745 and are credited with winning the day due to their timely reinforcement. The Grants of Glenmoriston branch also fought as Jacobites at the Battle of Culloden in 1746. Eighty-four Grants of Glenmoriston were captured at Culloden and were transported to Barbados, in violation of their terms of surrender, where they were sold as slaves.

At the Siege of Inverness (1746) the commander of the British-Hanoverian Government forces was Major George Grant, whilst amongst the Jacobite commanders was Colonel James Grant.

Highland clearances

Clan Grant was one of the few clans not to be affected by the Highland Clearances. The "Good Sir James" Grant (Clan Chief from 1773 to 1811) built the town of Grantown-on-Spey for the express purpose of providing for his clansmen to keep them from having to emigrate. While other Highlanders were emigrating in the face of the changes that were sweeping away the old Highland way of life, Sir James Grant was busy building an entire town, building schools, mills, factories, a hospital, an orphanage, etc. to provide for his Clan. Grantown-on-Spey is a monument to Sir James's loyalty to his clansmen.

British Army Regiments

During the later part of the 18th century two regiments were raised from the Clan Grant. Firstly the "Grant or Strathspey Fencibles" in 1793 and the "97th" or "Strathspey Regiment" in 1794. The first was disbanded in 1799 and the second, was used as marines on board Lord Howe's fleet and later drafted into other regiments in 1795.

President Grant

On his world tour in 1877, Ulysses S. Grant came to Scotland and he was accepted as a returning member of Clan Grant.

21st century

Duthil Old Parish Church and Churchyard, which lies just outside the village of Duthil, Inverness-shire, now serves as a Clan Grant Centre. The site includes many memorials to clan members, such as Field Marshal Sir Patrick Grant,  (1804–1895), as well as a mausoleum of the Earls of Seafield.

During a visit to Winnipeg, Canada in July 2012, the chief of Clan Grant declared that Métis leader Cuthbert Grant was a member of the clan. This created a new sept of Clan Grant in Canada. Visitors came from as far away as Scotland as well as from Yukon, Montana and Manitoba where Grant descendants settled to take part in events arranged for Lord Strathspey's time in Canada. Anita Grant Steele arrived with other descendants of William Grant of Trois-Rivières, Quebec, who was one of the originators of the North West Company and the senior partner of Grant, Campion and Company. Steele organised a reunion tea with Lord Strathspey at Winnipeg's Fort Garry Hotel and was named the first steward of the branch now known as the MacRobbie Grants of Trois-Rivières. The reunion included Donald L Grant, Emerald Grant and Roy Grant, who were responsible for the Y-DNA test results that positively determined the MacRobbie Grants of Trois-Rivières are a senior line from the same genetic line as the chiefs of Grant.
GrantReunion

Castles

Castle Grant was the seat of the Chief of Clan Grant.
Urquhart Castle owned by the Clan Grant from 1509, to 1912.
Ballindalloch Castle was owned by the Grants from 1499 onwards.
Loch an Eilein Castle, near Aviemore came into the possession of the Grants in 1567. It was attacked by Jacobites after their defeat at the Battle of Cromdale in 1690, but was successfully defended.

Chief

The current Chief of Clan Grant is the Rt Hon The Lord Strathspey (Sir James Patrick Trevor Grant of Grant, Bt, 6th Baron Strathspey, 33rd hereditary Clan chief of Clan Grant).

The arms of Baron Strathspey as matriculated by the 32nd Chief in 1950 are shown above : Gules three antique crowns Or in the dexter canton Argent a saltire Azure surmounted of an inescutcheon Or charged with a lion rampant within a double tressure flory counter flory being the addition of a Nova Scotia as a baronet.

See also

 Siol Alpin
 Duthil Old Parish Church and Churchyard

References

The Rulers of Strathspey, a history of the lairds of Grant and the Earls of Seafield, 1911, by the Earl of Cassilis
GrantReunion

External links
Clan Grant, Australia
 Clan Grant, UK
Clan Grant, USA
Grant Heraldry
Clan Grant Canada
Grant DNA Project

 
Grant